The Kermit Channel was an Asian television channel that was owned by the Jim Henson Company and Hallmark Entertainment until 2001, when Hallmark assumed full ownership and renamed the channel. It was a 24-hour cable channel that broadcast reruns of various Muppet productions.

History
Hallmark Entertainment and The Jim Henson Company started a partnership in May 1998 to launch the Kermit Channel in Asia and Latin America expect to start in September 1998 with distribution handled by Hallmark Entertainment Network. This partnership had grown out of their co-production of Gulliver’s Travels. In 1998, Kermit had extended a license for the Muppet to Wave, a Singapore-based licensing agent, for apparel, toys and games categories in Taiwan and the Philippines.

On August 31, 1998, the channel had a soft launch in Latin America and Asia with a revolving three-hour schedule. The next day, the channel's first general manager, Betsy Bruce, was announced. The Henson Co. and Hallmark were considering renaming the Odyssey Channel to Kermit Channel. A full schedule was put into place on October 1, 1998.

The channel was launched first in Taiwan in January 1999, followed by India, which debuted in the first week in January 1999 with distribution and marketing handled by Modi Entertainment Network. The channel was next rolled out in Indonesia. With uncertain over the market downturn, the Kermit Channel decided to focus on the Asia market. Kermit's launched was delayed until August 1999 in the Philippines. By December 1, 1999, the channel had six million subscribers earlier than projected by its business plan. The next markets the channel was planned to be launched in were Singapore and Malaysia, while considering Japan and China. However by January 2000, Hallmark Entertainment Networks decided to instead to focus on existing markets, India, Malaysia and the Philippines, to build up capacity in distribution and brand awareness.

As part of the reorganization of the Hallmark Entertainment, programming on The Kermit Channel in Asia was transferred in November 2000 to the Hallmark Network. On Hallmark it would initially air as a six-hour-a-day block, but was later shortened to three hours a day. In November 2002, the Asian channel was shut down except in India. The Kermit Channel aired in India,  until December 2002. Kermit was shut down due to the decision of Henson owner, EM.TV. Hallmark Entertainment Network and Modi were in discussion to replace the channel with a joint venture family channel.

Programming
Hallmark Entertainment and the Jim Henson Company were contributing their film libraries towards the channel. Additional programming were acquired from Children's Television Workshop (CTW).

Programming blocks
 Children's educational block
 Preschool block, is four hours long and home to the CTW programming

Shows
'The Ghost of Faffner Hall<ref
name="bsi"/>
Muppet Babies
Fraggle Rock
Pappyland
Aliens in the Family
Blackstar
The Animal Show
Muppets Tonight
Adventures
Mopatop's Shop
Encyclopedia, a live-action educational show based on an encyclopedia's pages
Construction Site (2000-) K2K
Brats of the Lost Nebula (2000-) K2K
''The Secret World of Alex Mack (2000-) K2K

K2K was a marketing push that included the introduction of additional shows tag with K2K above.

References

Hallmark Cards
The Jim Henson Company
Defunct television channels
Television channels and stations established in 1998
Television channels and stations disestablished in 2002
Defunct television networks in the Philippines
Defunct television channels in India